Sabatinca aenea is a species of moth belonging to the family Micropterigidae.  This species was first described by George Hudson in 1923. It is endemic to New Zealand and is found in Kaikōura and in the Canterbury regions. The larvae of this species is a deep grey green colour and likely feeds on foliose liverwort species. The adult moths likely feed on fern spores or sedge pollen. This species prefers moist semi-shaded habitat and the adults are on the wing from the start of October until the middle of December.

Taxonomy
This species was described by George Hudson in 1923 using a specimen collected by Stewart Lindsay at Governor's Bay in Canterbury. Hudson went on to discuss and illustrate the species in his 1928 book The butterflies and moths of New Zealand. The holotype specimen is held at the Museum of New Zealand Te Papa Tongarewa.

Description 

The larvae of this species are darkly grey green in colour and are similar in appearance to the larvae of S. doroxena.

Hudson described the adults of this species as follows:

The forewing patterns of this species are variable but can be similar to S. aurella.

Distribution 
This species is endemic to New Zealand. It is found in the Kaikoura and the Canterbury districts.

Behaviour 
Adult moths are on the wing from the start of October until the middle of December.

Host species and habitat 
The larvae of this species likely feed on foliose liverwort species with the adults likely feeding on fern spores or sedge pollen. Both the larvae and adults prefer damp semi-shaded habitat.

References

Micropterigidae
Moths described in 1923
Endemic fauna of New Zealand
Moths of New Zealand
Taxa named by George Hudson
Endemic moths of New Zealand